Carbasea elegans is a species of bryozoans in the family Flustridae found in Australia.

References

External links 

 
 WoRMS
 Atlas of Living Australia

Cheilostomatida
Animals described in 1852
Marine fauna of Australia